Nasreddin or Nasreddin Hodja (other variants include: Mullah Nasreddin Hooja, Nasruddin Hodja, Mullah Nasruddin, Mullah Nasriddin, Khoja Nasriddin) (1208-1285) is a character in the folklore of the Muslim world from the Balkans to China, and a hero of humorous short stories and satirical anecdotes. There are frequent statements about his existence in real life and even archaeological evidence in specific places, for example, a tombstone in the city of Akşehir, Turkey. At the moment, there is no confirmed information or serious grounds to talk about the specific date or place of Nasreddin's birth, so the question of the reality of his existence remains open. 

Nasreddin appears in thousands of stories, sometimes witty, sometimes wise, but often, too, a fool or the butt of a joke. A Nasreddin story usually has a subtle humour and a pedagogic nature. The International Nasreddin Hodja festival is celebrated between 5 and 10 July every year in Akşehir.

In 2020, an application to include "Telling tradition of Nasreddin Khoja" in the UNESCO Intangible Cultural Heritage list was jointly submitted by the governments of Azerbaijan, Kazakhstan, Kyrgyzstan, Uzbekistan, Tajikistan, Turkey and Turkmenistan.

Origin and legacy 

Claims about his origin are made by many ethnic groups. Many sources give the birthplace of Nasreddin as Hortu Village in Sivrihisar, Eskişehir Province, present-day Turkey, in the 13th century, after which he settled in Akşehir, and later in Konya under the Seljuq rule, where he died in 1275/6 or 1285/6 CE. It is claimed that the tomb of Nasreddin is in Akşehir, and the International Nasreddin Hodja Festival is held annually in Akşehir, 5–10 July.

There are also opposing views that Nasreddin's origin lies in Central Asia. 

The Arabic version of the character, known as "juha", is the oldest attested version of the character and the most divergent, being mentioned in Al-Jahiz's book "Saying on Mules"— —, according Al-Dhahabi's book "", his full name was "Abu al-Ghusn Dujayn al-Fizari", he lived under the Umayyads in Kufa, his mother was said to be a servant to Anas ibn Malik, thus he was one of the Tabi'un in Sunni tradition.

The oldest manuscript of Nasreddin dates to 1571. Some of the stories, however, are in the Philogelos and Aesop's fables.

Today, Nasreddin stories are told in a wide variety of regions, especially across the Muslim world and have been translated into many languages. Some regions independently developed a character similar to Nasreddin, and the stories have become part of a larger whole. In many regions, Nasreddin is a major part of the culture, and is quoted or alluded to frequently in daily life. Since there are thousands of different Nasreddin stories, one can be found to fit almost any occasion. Nasreddin often appears as a whimsical character of a large Turkish, Persian, Adyghe, Albanian, Armenian, Azerbaijani, Afghan, Bengali, Bosnian, Bulgarian, Chinese, Greek, Gujarati, Hindi, Judeo-Spanish, Kurdish, Romanian, Serbian, Russian, Ubykh, and Urdu folk tradition of vignettes.

1996–1997 was declared International Nasreddin Year by UNESCO.

Name 

Many peoples of the Near, Middle East, South Asia and Central Asia claim Nasreddin as their own (e.g., Turks, Afghans, Iranians, and Uzbeks). His name is spelt in a wide variety of ways: Nasrudeen, Nasrudin, Nasruddin, Nasriddin, Nasr ud-Din, Nasredin, Nasiruddin, Naseeruddin, Nasr Eddin, Nastradhin, Nasreddine, Nastratin, Nusrettin, Nasrettin, Nostradin, Nastradin (lit.: Victory of the Deen) and Nazaruddin. It is sometimes preceded or followed by a title or honorific used in the corresponding cultures: "Hoxha", "Khwaje", "Koja", "Hodja", "Hoja", "Hojja", "Hodscha", "Hodža", "Hoca", "Hocca","Hooka",
"Hogea", "Mullah", "Mulla", "Mula", "Molla", "Efendi", "Afandi", "Ependi" ( 'afandī), "Hajji". In several cultures he is named by the title alone.

In Arabic-speaking countries this character is known as "Juha", "Djoha", "Djuha", "Dschuha", "Chotzas", "Goha" ( juḥā). Juha was originally a separate folk character found in Arabic literature as early as the 9th century, and was widely popular by the 11th century. Lore of the two characters became amalgamated in the 19th century when collections were translated from Arabic into Turkish and Persian.

The Arabic name "Juha" is the reverse of the Turkish word "Hoja" (spelled in Turkish as Hoca), due to his well known story of riding the donkey in reverse position. Arabs used the word to refer the Turkish scolars and reversed the letters in reference to the famous story of Nasreddin. 

In Sicily and Southern Italy he is known as "Giufà", derived from the Arabic character Juha.

In the Swahili and Indonesian culture, many of his stories are being told under the name of "Abunuwasi" or "Abunawas", though this confuses Nasreddin with an entirely different man – the poet Abu Nuwas, known for homoerotic verse.

In China, where stories of him are well known, he is known by the various transliterations from his Uyghur name, 阿凡提 (Āfántí) and 阿方提 (Āfāngtí). The Uyghurs believe that he was from Xinjiang, while the Uzbeks believe he was from Bukhara. Shanghai Animation Film Studio produced a 13-episode Nasreddin related animation called 'The Story of Afanti'/ 阿凡提 in 1979, which became one of the most influential animations in China's history. The musical Nasirdin Apandim features the legend of Nasreddin effendi ("sir, lord"), largely sourced from Uyghur folklore.

In Central Asia, he is commonly known as "Afandi". The Central Asian peoples also claim his local origin, as do Uyghurs.

Afandi or Afanti originates from Turkish "Efendi" (Effendi) and this is a title still used to show respect in Turkey. The combination "Hoja Efendi" is used in Turkey very often for the Muslim scholars in modern times as well. The word "Efendi" is ultimately derived from Greek "Authentes" (αὐθέντης) into Turkish.  "Nasreddin Hoja Efendi" was shortened as "Efendi" in time. Subsequently "Efendi" happened to be the proper name as "Affandi" in Central Asia for Nasreddin Hoja.

Tales 
The Nasreddin stories are known throughout the Middle East and have touched cultures around the world. Superficially, most of the Nasreddin stories may be told as jokes or humorous anecdotes. They are told in the teahouses and caravanserais of Asia and in homes and on the radio. But it is inherent in a Nasreddin story that it may be understood at many levels. There is the joke, followed by a moral and usually the little extra which brings the consciousness of the potential mystic a little further on the way to realization.

Examples

The Sermon 
Once Nasreddin was invited to deliver a sermon. When he got on the pulpit, he asked, Do you know what I am going to say? The audience replied "no", so he announced, I have no desire to speak to people who don't even know what I will be talking about! and left.
The people felt embarrassed and called him back again the next day. This time, when he asked the same question, the people replied yes. So Nasreddin said, Well, since you already know what I am going to say, I won't waste any more of your time! and left.
Now the people were really perplexed. They decided to try one more time and once again invited the Mullah to speak the following week. Once again he asked the same question – Do you know what I am going to say? Now the people were prepared and so half of them answered "yes" while the other half replied "no". So Nasreddin said Let the half who know what I am going to say tell it to the half who don't, and left.

Whom do you believe? 

A neighbour came to the gate of Hodja Nasreddin's yard. The Hodja went to meet him outside.
"Would you mind, Hodja," the neighbour asked, "can you lend me your donkey today? I have some goods to transport to the next town."
The Hodja didn't feel inclined to lend out the animal to that particular man, however. So, not to seem rude, he answered:
"I'm sorry, but I've already lent him to somebody else."
All of a sudden the donkey could be heard braying loudly behind the wall of the yard.
"But Hodja," the neighbour exclaimed. "I can hear it behind that wall!"
"Whom do you believe," the Hodja replied indignantly, "the donkey or your Hodja?"

Taste the same 
Some children saw Nasreddin coming from the vineyard with two baskets full of grapes loaded on his donkey. They gathered around him and asked him to give them a taste.
Nasreddin picked up a bunch of grapes and gave each child a grape.
"You have so much, but you gave us so little," the children whined.
"There is no difference whether you have a basketful or a small piece. They all taste the same," Nasreddin answered, and continued on his way.

Nasreddin's ring 
Mullah had lost his ring in the living room. He searched for it for a while, but since he could not find it, he went out into the yard and began to look there. His wife, who saw what he was doing, asked: "Mullah, you lost your ring in the room, why are you looking for it in the yard?” Mullah stroked his beard and said: "The room is too dark and I can’t see very well. I came out to the courtyard to look for my ring because there is much more light out here".

In Asian and Caucasus folk tradition and literature 

Uzbeks consider Nasreddin an Uzbek who was born and lived in Bukhara, and  stories about him are called latifa or afandi.
There are at least two collections of Uzbek stories related to Nasriddin Afandi:
 "Afandining qirq bir passhasi" – (Forty-one flies of Afandi) – Zohir A'lam, Tashkent
 "Afandining besh xotini" – (Five wives of Afandi)

Nasreddin was the main character in a magazine, called simply Molla Nasraddin, published in Azerbaijan and "read across the Muslim world from Morocco to Iran". The eight-page Azerbaijani satirical periodical was published in Tiflis (from 1906 to 1917), Tabriz (in 1921) and Baku (from 1922 to 1931) in the Azeri and occasionally Russian languages. Founded by Jalil Mammadguluzadeh, it depicted inequality, cultural assimilation, and corruption and ridiculed the backward lifestyles and values of clergy and religious fanatics. The magazine was frequently banned but had a lasting influence on Azerbaijani and Iranian literature.

He is known as Mullah Nasruddin in South Asian children's books. A TV serial on him was aired in India as Mulla Nasiruddin.

In European and Western folk tradition and literature 
Some Nasreddin tales also appear in collections of Aesop's fables. The miller, his son and the donkey is one example. Others are "The Ass with a Burden of Salt" (Perry Index 180) and "The Satyr and the Traveller."

In some Bulgarian folk tales that originated during the Ottoman period, the name appears as an antagonist to a local wise man, named Sly Peter. In Sicily the same tales involve a man named Giufà. In Sephardic culture, spread throughout the Ottoman Empire, a character that appears in many folk tales is named Djohá.

In Romanian, the existing stories come from an 1853 verse compilation edited by Anton Pann, a philologist and poet renowned for authoring the current Romanian anthem.

Nasreddin is mostly known as a character from short tales; however, he has also been featured in longer mediums, such as novels and films. In Russia, Nasreddin is known mostly because of the Russian work Возмутитель спокойствия by Leonid Solovyov (English translations: "The Beggar in the Harem: Impudent Adventures in Old Bukhara", 1956, and "The Tale of Hodja Nasreddin: Disturber of the Peace", 2009). The composer Shostakovich celebrated Nasreddin, among other figures, in the second movement (Yumor, "Humor") of his Symphony No. 13. The text, by Yevgeny Yevtushenko, portrays humor as a weapon against dictatorship and tyranny. Shostakovich's music shares many of the "foolish yet profound" qualities of Nasreddin's sayings listed above.

The Graeco-Armenian mystic G. I. Gurdjieff often referred to "our own dear Mullah Nasr Eddin", also
calling him an "incomparable teacher", particularly in his book Beelzebub's Tales. Sufi philosopher Idries Shah published several collections of Nasruddin stories in English, and emphasized their teaching value.

Film
In 1943, the Soviet film Nasreddin in Bukhara was directed by Yakov Protazanov based on Solovyov's book, followed in 1947 by a film called The Adventures of Nasreddin, directed by Nabi Ganiyev and also set in the Uzbekistan SSR.

In 1964, Richard Williams, a Canadian-British animator, began work on Nasrudin, an animated film based on the character. The film was produced with the help of Idries Shah, for whom Williams had illustrated books about the character; however, tensions between Williams' crew and the Shah family caused Williams to end his relationship with them, causing him to lose his right to use Nasreddin as a character. The unfinished film was later reworked into The Thief and the Cobbler, which had a similarly troubled production history.

Collections 

 Bacha,Mohamed30 Funny Stories of Joha, The Beloved Folk Hero of The East (bilingual English - Arabic) 
  
 600 Mulla Nasreddin Tales, collected by Mohammad Ramazani (Popular Persian Text Series: 1) (in Persian).
 Tales of the Hodja, retold by Charles Downing, illustrated by William Papas. Oxford University Press: London, 1964.
 The Exploits of the Incomparable Mulla Nasreddin, by Idries Shah, illustrated by Richard Williams
 The Subtleties of the Inimitable Mulla Nasreddin, by Idries Shah, illustrated by Richard Williams.
 The Pleasantries of the Incredible Mulla Nasrudin, by Idries Shah, illustrated by Richard Williams and Errol Le Cain
 Mullah Nasiruddiner Galpo (Tales of Mullah Nasreddin) collected and retold by Satyajit Ray, (in Bengali)
 The Wisdom of Mulla Nasruddin, by Shahrukh Husain
 Watermelons, Walnuts, and the Wisdom of Allah and Other Tales of the Hoca, by Barbara K. Walker, Illustrated by Harold Berson 
 The Uncommon Sense of the Immortal Mullah Nasruddin: Stories, jests, and donkey tales of the beloved Persian folk hero, collected and retold by Ron Suresha.
 
 The Wise Old Man: Turkish Tales of Nasreddin Hodja, told by Lyon Bajar Juda, illustrated by Tessa Theobald. Thomas Nelson and Sons Ltd: Edinburgh, 1963.
 Extraordinary Adventures of Mullah Nasruddin: Naughty, unexpurgated tales of the beloved wise fool from the Middle and Far East, collected and retold by Ron Suresha.
 Melayê Meşhûr (The famous Mulla) by Mehmed Emîn Bozarslan, Uppsala: Deng Publishers, 85 pp., 1986 (in Kurdish)
 Once There Was, Twice There Wasn't: Fifty Turkish Folktales of Nasreddin Hodja, adapted by Michael Shelton. Boston: Hey Nonny Nonny Press, 2014
 Twenty-Four Nasreddins (1986), a collective work (in Russian)

References

External links 

 Elements of Humor in Central Asia: The Example of the Journal Molls Nasreddin in Azerbaijan
 Benjamin Franklin and Nasreddin of Asia Minor
 Introduction to Keloglan, on Nasreddin
 Several illustrated Hodja stories
 Gold donkey of Nasreddin Hodja. Theatrical performances of the play Sh. Kaziev
 Books on Nasruddin from India
 Grigore—The Wise Fool Djuha—A Quick Sketch
 Wisdom Lessons From Turkish Literature to Managers and Leaders (Türk Edebiyatından Yöneticilere ve Liderlere Bilgelik Dersleri)—UPenn master's thesis by Gokmen Durmus on Turkish wisdom and Nasreddin Hodja's stories (archive)
Stories about Nasreddin Hodja by D. L. Ashliman

 
Afghan culture
Arab culture
Arabic literature
Chinese folklore
Fabulists
Folklore characters
Humor and wit characters
Iranian folklore
Islamic comedy and humor
Kurdish culture
Legendary Islamic people
Medieval legends
Ottoman literature
Persian literature
Rhetoric
Stock characters in jokes
Sufi fiction
Turkish folklore
Turkish literature
Turkish Sufis
Urdu-language literature
Uyghur literature
Uzbekistani culture
Tricksters